Senator Pope may refer to:

Members of the United States Senate
James P. Pope (1884–1966), U.S. Senator from Idaho from 1933 to 1939
John Pope (Kentucky politician) (1770–1845), U.S. Senator from Kentucky from 1807 to 1813

United States state senate members
Carl C. Pope (1834–1911), Wisconsin State Senate
Verle A. Pope (1903–1973), Florida State Senate
William Henry Pope (U.S. politician) (1847–1913), Texas State Senate